Jinghong (also formerly romanised as Chiang Hung, Chengrung, Cheng Hung, Jeng Hung,  Jinghung, Keng Hung, Kiang Hung and Muangjinghung) is a city in and the seat of Xishuangbanna Dai Autonomous Prefecture, in the far south of China's Yunnan province, and the historic capital of the former Tai kingdom of Sipsongpanna.

History
The town was founded as Chiang Hung (Cheli), by Tai king Phanya Coeng in 1180.

Kingdom of Chiang Hung (Sipsongpanna)
During the Mongol Yuan Dynasty in China, the Tai kingdom of Sipsongpanna began a close and long-lasting relationship to Lanna, another historic Tai kingdom that lay south. In 1296, Lanna's capital Chiang Mai was founded by Mangrai, whose maternal grandfather was King Rung Kaen Chai of Jinghong (i.e.: Sipsongpanna).

The kingdoms of Sipsongpanna and Lanna maintained ties through migration and intermarriage.

In 1401, the Sipsongpanna Tai ruler Tau Se Da Xam (pinyin: Dao Xianda) attacked a smaller Tai area to the north unknown as Weiyuan equivalent to modern Jinggu).  The Ming administration sought to retaliate but adopted a cautious response of diplomacy and Tau Se Da Xam withdrew his troops.  About this period Sipsongpanna began to pay tribute to the Ming.

In 1405 the Sipsongpanna Tai attacked Chiang Mai, in conjunction with Ming Chinese troops.

In 1421 the Chinese attempted to cause a split in Sipsongpanna by backing multiple administrations during a period of civil strife, but their plan failed to succeed.

1448 saw the defeat of Mong Mao, a Tai state in eastern Burma, by a combination of Chinese, Sipsongpanna and allied forces united under the Ming.

In the 1450s another struggle for succession arose in Sipsongpanna, with one faction backed by Kengtung and one by Chiang Mai. Despite the Kengtung faction's victory, conflict started with that state shortly afterwards.

The Burmese Toungoo state arose in the 1530s to crush Chiang Mai, and its influence also extended to Kengtung and Sipsongpanna, which like other Tai kingdoms soon began to pay tribute.

Geography and climate

Jinghong has a latitude range of 21°27'–22°36' N and a longitude range of 100°25'–101°31' E. It borders Pu'er City to the north, Mengla County to the east and Menghai County to the west, as well as Burma's Shan State to the south. The city is limited to the south by Hengduan Mountains, and the Lancang River (Mekong) passes through Jinghong. Two bridges near the city span this river, which flows south-east towards Laos.

Climatically, Jinghong contains elements of both a tropical wet and dry climate and a humid subtropical climate (Köppen Aw and Cwa, respectively). The city has a generally humid climate with strong monsoonal influences. Summer is long and there is virtually no "winter" as such; instead, there is a dry season (December thru April) and wet season (May thru October). However, high temperatures reach their peak in April before the onset of the monsoon from the Indian Ocean.

Administrative divisions
Jinghong City has 1 subdistrict, 5 towns, 3 townships and 2 ethnic townships. 
1 subdistrict
 Yunjinghong Subdistrict
5 towns

3 townships
 Jingne
 Dadugang
 Mengwang
2 ethnic townships
 Jingha Hani
 Jinuoshan Jinuo

Transport

Xishuangbanna Gasa International Airport is the second largest airport in Yunnan, located just five kilometers from the downtown. Flights to Kunming, Shanghai, Chengdu and other major cities in China run regularly. There is one weekly international flight to Luang Prabang (resumes 1 November).
The city has the largest public transportation center in Xishuangbanna and connects travelers to nearby cities, towns and villages.
China National Highway 214
China National Highway 213
Asian Highway Network AH3
Kunming–Bangkok Expressway
Xishuangbanna railway station

Places of interest
The Dai Water Splashing Festival and nearby villages of that and other ethnic groups are the main attractions.  Additionally, at least three botanical parks and gardens are located in or near the city, of which Xishuangbanna Tropical Botanical Garden is the largest and most famous one.

Notes

References
Turton, Andrew (ed.) Civility and Savagery: Social Identity in Tai States. Routledge, 2000. 
Patterson Giersch, Charles. Asian Borderlands: The Transformation of Qing China's Yunnan Frontier. Harvard University Press, 2006. 

External links

Jinghong City Official Website

.

County-level divisions of Xishuangbanna Prefecture
Tourism in Yunnan
 
Cities in Yunnan